The American Equatorial Islands Colonization Project was a plan initiated in 1935 by the U.S. Department of Commerce to place citizens of the United States on uninhabited Howland, Baker and Jarvis islands in the central Pacific Ocean so that weather stations and landing fields could be built for military and commercial use on air routes between Australia and California. Additionally, the U.S. government wanted to claim these remote islands to provide a check on eastern territorial expansion by the Empire of Japan. In 1937, the project was expanded to include Canton and Enderbury in the Phoenix Islands. The project ended in early 1942 when the colonists were rescued from the islands at the start of the War in the Pacific.

History

The United States first began establishing its presence in the Equatorial Pacific during the mid-19th century through guano mining conducted by private American companies under the Guano Islands Act. After several decades, guano resources became depleted,  leading to the diminishing presence of American companies on the islands; they were thus vulnerable to development and claim by other nations, especially the regional rival, Imperial Japan. The United States  maintained a desire for military and commercial air routes between Australia and California,  routes that would be facilitated by the use of the islands of Howland, Baker and Jarvis. In 1935, the Department of Commerce developed a clandestine colonization plan with the objective of placing U.S. citizens on the remote islands in order for the United States to lay claim to them. The colonization program called for non-active military personnel in order to avoid conflicting with international law regarding colonization by military.

William T. Miller, Superintendent of Airways at the Department of Commerce, was appointed to lead the  project. He traveled to Hawaii in February 1935,  met with Albert F. Judd, Trustee of Kamehameha Schools and the Bishop Museum, and agreed that recent graduates and students of the Kamehameha School for Boys would make ideal colonists for the project. 

Multiple federal agencies vied for the right to administer the colonization project, including the Department of Commerce, the Department of the Interior, and the Navy Department, but jurisdiction was ultimately granted to the Department of the Interior. 

During the seven years of colonization, more than 130 young men participated in the project, the majority of whom were Hawaiian. In 1940, when the issue of discontinuing the colonization project was raised, the Navy acknowledged that the islands were "probably worthless to commercial aviation" but advocated for "continued occupation" because the islands could serve as "bases from a military standpoint." 

Although the interests that "justified" continued occupation of the islands were military, the colonists were never informed of the true nature of the project, nor were the colonists provided with weapons or any other means of self-defense.

End of the program

In June 1941, the Commandant of the 14th Naval District  recognized the "tension in the Western Pacific" and recommended the evacuation of the colonists, but his request was denied. On December 8, 1941, Howland Island was attacked by a fleet of Japanese twin-engine bombers, which killed Hawaiian colonists Joseph Keliihananui and Richard Whaley. In the ensuing weeks, Japanese submarine and military aircraft continued to target the islands of Howland, Baker, and Jarvis. The four colonists from Baker and the two remaining colonists from Howland were rescued on January 31, 1942, and the eight colonists from Jarvis and Enderbury were rescued on February 9, 1942, two months after the initial attacks on Howland Island. In July 1943, a military base was established on Baker Island and played a substantial role in the Tarawa-Makin operation, a significant U.S. offensive against the Japanese fleet in the Pacific theatre.

Post World War II (1956), the participants of the colonization project established an organization to preserve the fellowship of their group, naming it "". In 1974, the islands of Howland, Baker and Jarvis were designated as National Wildlife Refuges and are now part of the Pacific Remote Islands Marine National Monument. The islands of Canton and Enderbury became part of the Republic of Kiribati.

See also 

 Phoenix Islands Settlement Scheme

Gallery

References

Baker Island
Howland Island
Jarvis Island
History of United States expansionism
Settlement schemes in the United States
1935 establishments in the United States
1942 disestablishments in the United States
Settlement schemes in Oceania